Przemysław Macierzyński (born 11 February 1999) is a Polish professional footballer who plays as a forward for Unia Kunice.

References

External links

1999 births
Living people
People from Lubsko
Polish footballers
Polish expatriate footballers
Poland youth international footballers
Association football forwards
UKS SMS Łódź players
Lechia Gdańsk players
S.L. Benfica footballers
Gryf Wejherowo players
Miedź Legnica players
Ekstraklasa players
II liga players
III liga players
Expatriate footballers in Portugal
Polish expatriate sportspeople in Portugal